Sylvia Malgadey-Forgrave (born 22 May 1957) is a Canadian hurdler. She competed in the women's 100 metres hurdles at the 1984 Summer Olympics.

References

External links
 
 

1957 births
Living people
Athletes (track and field) at the 1984 Summer Olympics
Canadian female hurdlers
Olympic track and field athletes of Canada
Athletes (track and field) at the 1982 Commonwealth Games
Commonwealth Games competitors for Canada
World Athletics Championships athletes for Canada
Sportspeople from Kitchener, Ontario